Speed limit for cars:

 within town and villages
 outside towns
 on expressways
 on motorways

Speed limit for motorcycles, buses and trucks without trailers:

 within towns and village
outside towns
 on motorways

Speed limit for cars, buses and trucks with trailers:

 within towns and village
 outside towns
 on motorways

Speed limit for trucks carrying dangerous goods:

  within towns
  outside towns
  on motorways

Speed limit for tractors, trolleybuses and trams:

 

Speed limit for mopeds:

 

Speed limit for other automobiles:

References

Bulgaria
Transport in Bulgaria